Sajid Hasan is a Pakistani actor. 

Hasan made his film debut in 2004 with the movie Salakhain in which he played the antagonist. He then  acted in Pehla Pehla Pyar. He also had a role in the Angelina Jolie film A Mighty Heart. Sajid Hasan can be seen in his next film 'Kahay Dil Jidhar'

Filmography
 Salakhain, (2004)
 Pehla Pehla Pyaar, (2006)
 A Mighty Heart, (2007)
 Aazaan, (2011)
 Jalaibee (2015)
 Maalik (2016)
 Abdullah: The Final Witness (2016)
 Rahm (2016)
 Kaaf Kangana (2018)
Kahay Dil Jidhar (2020)

Television
 Agar
 Dhoop Kinaray
 Kachwa aur Khargosh
 Sitara Aur Mehrunnisa
 Aashti
 Tan Sen
 Masuri
 Jaaye Kahaan YEH Dil
 Nijaat
 Akhri Barish
 Man Jali
 Thori Si Wafa Chahiye
 Hum Tum
 Daddy
 Tanha
 Aur Ghanti Baj Gayi
 Jannat Se Nikali Huee Aurat
 Koi Nahi Apna
 Khataa
 Choti Si Ghalat Fehmi (Daily Soap)
 Paiwand
 Balaa as Zafar
 Beqasoor as Shehryar
 Unsuni
 Ek Jhoota Lafz Mohabbat
 Inaam e Mohabbat

Awards and nominations 
 Winner: Best Sitcom Drama Writer in The 1st Indus Drama Awards 2005
 Nominee: Best Director for Sitcom in The 1st Indus Drama Awards 2005

See also 
 List of Pakistani actors

References

External links
 

Living people
Pakistani male television actors
Pakistani male film actors
Male actors from Karachi
BOL Network people
Year of birth missing (living people)